Rayudu Arun Kumar is an Indian artistic roller skater from Visakhapatnam, Andhra Pradesh. He is an Asian Silver Medalist, ranked Asian No.2 in the senior category and world No.5 in the under-19 category. He has been a national champion for the last 13 years. He has been playing for Team India since 2014. He has also been the All India Inter-University Champion for the 3 years. He is considered to be one of the best Figure Skaters in India. He has been the captain of Andhra Pradesh Roller Skating Team since 2017.

Career 
He has won many medals nationally and internationally, including 12 Gold, 16 Silver, 11 Bronze medals at India's Roller Skating National Championships and 22 Gold, 15 Silver and 12 Bronze medals at the Andhra Pradesh Roller Skating State Championships. At the Asian Roller Skating Championship he won 2 Silver and 1 Bronze.

He has been the captain of the Andhra Pradesh Roller Skating Team since 2017. Under his captaincy, the team won the National Championship for 3 Years.

Arun hit a hat-trick in roller sports by bagging a gold medal in the National Inter-University Roller Sports tournament 2020, In All India Inter-University Games, he has been representing Jawaharlal Nehru Technological University, Kakinada for the three years and was the All India Inter-University Champion in all the years. He is the first individual athlete from Jawaharlal Nehru Technological University to secure the gold medal in the All India Inter-University Games. His skating partner for both pair and couple dance events is Farheen Shaik. His debuted for Team India in 2014 at the 16th Asian Roller Skating Championship held in Haining where he placed fourth.

In 2015, he participated in the 21st Junior World Roller Figure Skating Championship in Cali.

In 2016, he won 1 Silver and 1 Bronze in the Open (Senior) Category in the Pair Skating and Couple Dance categories with his partner Shaik at the 17th Asian Roller Skating Championship in Lishui.

He was ranked World No. 5 in Under 19 Category in the 2017 World Roller Games. In 2018, he secured a silver medal in Open (Senior) Category in the 18th Asian Roller Skating Championship held in Namwon City, South Korea.

Milestones 

 1 Gold & 1 Silver Medal, in his 1st State Level Competition (2005–06) while studying 1st Standard 
 1 Gold Medal, in his 1st National Level Competition (2007–08) while studying 3rd Standard
 Achieved 5th Rank in the World Roller Games (2017–18)
 1st International medals (1 Silver & 1 Bronze) in 17th Asian Roller Skating Championship (2016–17)

References 

Living people
Sportspeople from Visakhapatnam
Indian roller skaters
Indian male single skaters
Artistic roller skaters
1999 births